The 2004 United States presidential primaries can refer to:

2004 Democratic Party presidential primaries
2004 Republican Party presidential primaries